Indocalamus is a genus of about 35 species of flowering plants in the grass family (Poaceae), native to China, Vietnam and Japan. They have thick, glossy leaves. Ruo leaves use to wrap foods like rice during dragon boat festival, originate in fujian refer to Indocalamus longiauritus originally but now are nonspecific to just about any leaf wrap.

Some species were formerly included in Sasa and Sasamorpha.

Species

Formerly included
see Acidosasa Ampelocalamus Arundinaria Bashania Bonia Fargesia Pleioblastus Pseudosasa Sinobambusa Yushania

References

Bambusoideae
Bambusoideae genera
Flora of China
Flora of Indo-China
Taxa named by Takenoshin Nakai